Pedro Eleodoro Paulet Mostajo (2 July 1874 or 4 July 1875 – 30 January 1945) was a Peruvian diplomat. He claimed to have been the first person to build a liquid-propellant rocket engine and modern rocket propulsion system, but his claim has never been verified.

Early life

Pedro Eleodoro Paulet Mostajo was born on 2 July 1874 or 4 July 1875, to Pedro Paulet and Antonina Mostajo in Arequipa, Peru; his father died three years later. He was educated at San Vicente de Paul School, founded by French priest Hippolyte Duhamel. He graduated from National University of Saint Augustine with a Bachelor of Science and Arts. He went to Europe in 1895, and studied at the Institute of Applied Chemistry at the University of Paris from 1898 to 1901, where he graduated with a degree in industrial engineering. Paulet stated that during his time at the University of Paris he was inspired by the work of Marcellin Berthelot in explosive materials. Paulet married Louise Wilquet after returning to Europe in 1910.

Career
Paulet was named as the Peruvian Counsel in Antwerp in 1902, and served in the role for a few years. He became the first director of the Escuela Nacional de Artes y Oficios after returning to Peru in 1905. President Augusto B. Leguía appointed him as the consul in Dresden, Germany in 1921. He later served in Peruvian consulates in Argentina, Japan, Netherlands, and Norway. He wrote about a proposed military submarine in September 1909.

Rocketry claims

In 1902, Paulet designed a liquid-fueled "rocket engine" for the Avión Torpedo aircraft, with the proposal being in complete contrast to the intellectual interest in gunpowder rockets at the time. He would spend decades seeking funds for the project, though he ultimately did not find donors.

Paulet's claims were unknown prior to October 27, 1927, when the Peruvian newspaper El Comercio published a letter he wrote, in which he claimed to have conceived a "rocket airplane project" 30 years prior. Paulet claimed that his rocket motor, weighing 2.5 kilos, had three hundred explosions per minute and had ninety kilograms of thrust.

Replying to comments in 1927 by Austrian inventor Max Valier discussing a rocket powered aircraft crossing the Atlantic Ocean faster than Charles Lindbergh, Paulet – the Peruvian consul in Rotterdam at the time – criticized Valier's proposal and recommended an aircraft powered by liquid-propellant rockets, stating that he had made plans for a rocket-propelled aircraft thirty years prior. Paulet's recommendation occurred at a time when news of Robert H. Goddard's 1926 liquid-propellant rocket launch was not notable, details about the Goddard's work had not reached Europe and in fact, no liquid-propelled rockets had been launched yet in Europe. A unique feature of Paulet's rocket design was its difference from Goddard's; unlike Goddard's rocket, Paulet's rocket utilized an intermittent fuel injection process that provided more efficiency and stability. 

Paulet stated that his experiments were "made, truly, without witnesses." In 1944, Paulet stated that his rocket could fly up to 600 miles per hour in the outer atmosphere.

Visiting the German rocket association Verein für Raumschiffahrt (VfR), Paulet's liquid-propelled rocket design was applauded by Valier. Paulet would finally gain interest in his work from Nazi Germany, though he refused to work with the government and never shared the formula to his liquid propellant.

Veracity
Willy Ley was one of the first people to express skepticism of Paulet's claims and stated that "The doubts are obviously correct" in Grundriss einer Geschichte der Rakete. and criticized S.B. Scherschevsky, who believed Paulet's claims, stating that he "uncritically put hearsay into some of his articles, and into his one and only book." In History of Rocketry & Space Travel Wernher von Braun wrote that he believed that Paulet's claims "would probably have gone unnoticed" without Scherschevsky's support.

Paulet's claims were accepted by some, such as George P. Sutton, but were not verified and James H. Wyld, who Sutton cited, stated that "the validity of his claim may be rather doubtful." Max Valier believed Paulet and stated that "the work of the Peruvian Paulet is most important for present projects leading to rocket ships, for it proved for the first time, in contrast to powder rockets burning only a few seconds, that by using liquid propellants, the construction of a rocket motor functioning for periods of hours would be feasible."

Frederick I. Ordway III and von Braun studied the veracity of his claims rose during the 1960s. El Comercio published drawings of Paulet's designs on 10 March 1965, in the article A Peruvian Engineer is the World Forerunner of Jet Propulsion Aircraft. Another article by El Comercio on 12 December cited Manuel del Castillo, president of the Organismo Nacional de Investigacions Espaciales, claimed to prove Paulet's claims although the main source was Wyld.

Death
Paulet died on 30 January 1945.

Legacy

Liquid propellant chemist John D. Clark also raised serious doubts about Paulet's claimed nineteenth century experiments.

Paulet's Avión Torpedo was featured in a Google Doodle to commemorate the birthday of Pedro Paulet in 2011. In Peru, the National Commission for Aerospace Research and Development launched a series of rockets bearing Paulet's name. Beginning in 2016, he was prominently featured on the 100 soles banknote of the Peruvian Nuevo Sol.

See also
 Konstantin Tsiolkovsky
 Robert H. Goddard
 Spacecraft propulsion

References

Works cited

Bibliography

External links
 Biographical information

1870s births
1945 deaths
Peruvian people of French descent
People from Arequipa
Peruvian diplomats
University of Paris alumni